Picture This are an Irish pop rock musical band based in Athy, County Kildare, Ireland, comprising Ryan Hennessy, Jimmy Rainsford, Owen Cardiff and Cliff Deane. In 2017, they released their eponymous debut album, which entered atop the Irish Albums Chart. In early 2019, they released their follow up album Mdrn Lv. Their third studio album “Life In Colour” was released in June 2021.

Biography
Picture This originate from Athy, County Kildare, Ireland. The band consists of  Ryan Hennessy (vocals), Jimmy Rainsford (drums), Owen Cardiff (Guitar) and Cliff Deane (Bass). Rainsford had previously toured with Ryan Sheridan, whilst Hennessy had been a member of another local band. Deane, Cardiff and Rainsford were childhood friends. Deane and Cardiff joined the band when Hennessy and Rainsford asked them to play with Picture This.

History

2015–2017: Breakthrough and Picture This

In October 2015, Ryan Hennessy recorded a sample of the song "Take My Hand" on his iPhone, which he and Rainsford later recorded in the studio. The video was uploaded to Facebook and YouTube, and has amassed over 4 million views across all platforms. The band's debut gig was to be played in the Grand Social venue in Dublin, which they sold out in under 30 minutes. To meet the demand, the gig was moved to The Academy, which has a capacity of 850 people. The band became the first act to sell out the venue for their debut gig.

The band announced a 20-date tour of Ireland in spring 2016. The tour began in Leixlip on 4 June and culminated with three dates at the Olympia, a 1,600 capacity venue in Dublin on 1–3 November. By 22 July 2016 tickets for 16 of the shows had sold out, including two dates at the Olympia. The band later announced that they would be playing a third and final date at the Olympia on 3 November 2016.

In July 2016, the band announced that they would be releasing their debut self-titled EP on 12 August. The track list featured five original songs including "Take My Hand". The EP debuted at number 1 on the Irish Albums Chart for the week ending 18 August 2016.

In May 2017, Picture This released "Never Change", the lead single from their debut studio album. Rainsford told Billboard the song was inspired by "the feeling of loving somebody exactly how they are and never wanting them to change a thing. The video signifies that we could go anywhere in the world but we always end up back home and will never change that."

They released their self-titled debut album on 25 August 2017.

2018–present: Mdrn Lv & Life in Colour
On 23 March 2018, Picture This released "This Morning". On 15 June 2018, they released "When We Were Young". On 17 October 2018, they announced their second album, Mdrn Lv, and released its lead single, "One Drink". Following the release, they also announced their second headline tour. On 7 December 2018, they released the second single from Mdrn Lv, "Everything or Nothing". The album was released on 19 February 2019, with a performance atop the Empire State Building in New York City. On 18 October 2019 they released their single "One Night". On 19 October they announced three concert dates in Ireland in Cork, Dublin and Belfast for June 2020.

In June 2021, the band released their third studio album, Life in Colour  which includes the single LA House Party and the album debuted at number 2 on the Irish charts.

Band members
 Ryan Hennessy – vocals
 Jimmy Rainsford – drums
 Owen Cardiff – guitar
 Cliff Deane - bass

Discography

Studio albums

Extended plays

Singles

Other charted songs

See also
 Music of Ireland

References

External links
 

Musical groups established in 2015
Irish pop music groups
Musical groups from County Kildare
2015 establishments in Ireland